The 2012 South Alabama Jaguars football team represented the University of South Alabama in the 2012 NCAA Division I FBS football season. They were led by fourth-year head coach Joey Jones and played their home games at Ladd–Peebles Stadium. They were a member of the Sun Belt Conference. As part of their two-year transition to the FBS from the FCS, the Jaguars were not eligible for the Sun Belt championship and were not eligible to play in a bowl game. They finished the season 2–11, 1–7 in Sun Belt play to finish in last place.

Schedule

Coach death
On April 11, inside linebacker coach Kurt Crain was found dead in Spanish Fort, Alabama from an apparent self-inflicted gunshot wound. Crain had been on the Jaguars staff since 2008. He was 47 years old.

References

South Alabama
South Alabama Jaguars football seasons
South Alabama Jaguars football